Lesaka is a town and municipality in the province and  autonomous community of Navarre, in Spain. It is situated in the merindad of Iruña, in the region of Bortziriak (Five Villas) and to 75 km of the capital of the community, Iruña/Pamplona. The population in 2014 was of 2742 inhabitants.

The population centres in Lesaka are the following: Alkaiaga, Auzoberri, Biurrana, Kaztazpegi, Endara, Endarlaza, Frain, Izotzaldea, Lesaka centre, Navaz, Otsango Auzoa, Zala, and Zalain.

References

External links
 LESAKA in the Bernardo Estornés Lasa - Auñamendi Encyclopedia (Euskomedia Fundazioa) 

Municipalities in Navarre